Joyce Lonergan (March 5, 1934 – January 17, 2006) was an American politician who served in the Iowa House of Representatives from 1975 to 1987.

Born in Benton County, Lonergan graduated from Boone High School and attended Boone Junior College.

References

1934 births
2006 deaths
Democratic Party members of the Iowa House of Representatives
20th-century American politicians